Zandaakhüügiin Enkhbold (born May 23, 1966 in Ulaanbaatar) was the chairman or speaker of the State Great Khural from 2012 to 2016. He spent his childhood in Selenge Province. He was educated at Ural State University in Russia as an electrical engineer with a concentration on automation and telemetry from 1984 to 1989. Later, he earned a diploma of law from the National University of Mongolia in 1996 and graduated with an IMBA from the University of Denver in 2004.

Although he joined the pro-democracy movement in late 1989 and the Mongolian Social Democratic Party in 1990, Enkhbold emerged on the political scene in 1996 when he was appointed the Chairman of State Property Committee, the government agency responsible for the administration of the privatization process in Mongolia.

After electoral defeat in 2000, Enkhbold was elected as secretary-general of the Democratic Party (Mongolia) (DP). However, he resigned from his post after the DP lost the 2001 presidential election. Enkhbold assumed his seat in parliament from Övörkhangai Province in 2005. He was one of three sponsors of the controversial Windfall Profits Tax that was abolished when the Mongolian government signed an Investment Agreement for the Oyu Tolgoi mine. During his third parliamentary term, he served as the Chairman of the Standing Committee on Security and Foreign Policy from 2008-2011.

Enkhbold has been perceived and has maintained his image as a brave, honest, and disinterested politician. Unlike most leaders in the DP, he has been much less involved in deals between the DP and the Mongolian People's Party (MPP) since 2004 and did not serve as a cabinet member in the coalition governments of 2004 and 2008. Moreover, Enkhbold has often come to public attention through his questions and statements about misconduct of politicians, often including fellow DP members.

In 2012, Enkhbold founded “Shonkhor” (Falcon), an influential faction within the DP. Enkhbold was a co-author of the new parliamentary election law of early 2012 that introduced a mix of majoritarian districts and proportional representation, a women's quota for candidates, electronic counting of ballots, and more stringent requirements for candidates and party platforms.

In the June 2012 election, the DP listed him second on its proportional representation party list. Following the DP victory he has become Speaker of Parliament.

He was unseated in the June 2016 election.

References

1966 births
Living people
National University of Mongolia alumni
Democratic Party (Mongolia) politicians
Speakers of the State Great Khural
People from Ulaanbaatar
Ural State University alumni